Henry Sands Brooks (September 8, 1772 – December 21, 1833) was an American clothier and businessman. He founded Brooks Brothers, the oldest clothier in the United States.

Biography

Early life
Henry Sands Brooks was born on September 8, 1772. His father was a doctor from Connecticut. He had a brother, John.

Career
He moved to New York City and worked as a grocer.

In 1818, at the age of forty-five, he purchased a building on the corner of Cherry Street and Catherine Street in Manhattan and founded Brooks Brothers.

References

1772 births
1833 deaths
People from Sands Point, New York
Businesspeople from New York City
19th-century American businesspeople
People of colonial Connecticut